Héctor Robledo Cervantes is a Mexican businessman and a supporter of scouting. He has a degree in Architecture from Universidad Nacional Autonoma de Mexico (UNAM). He has founded several construction and lifestyle companies.

Héctor Robledo Cervantes is a Mexican businessman and supporter of exploration. He has a degree in Architecture from the National Autonomous University of Mexico.

He is the chairman for the World Scout Foundation and has been a member of the board since 2012. He has also been the vice-president of the Interamerican Scout Foundation.

References

Harvard Business School alumni
1963 births
Living people
International Scouting leaders
Mexican businesspeople